Lorenco Šimić (born 15 July 1996) is a Croatian footballer who plays as a centre-back for Italian  club Ascoli. He also played for the Croatia U21 national team.

Club career

Hajduk Split
Šimić is a product of the youth system of Hajduk Split.

Loan at Hoverla Uzhorod
He went on loan to Hoverla Uzhhorod in the Ukrainian Premier League in January 2015. He made his Ukrainian Premier League debut on 4 May 2015, in a match against Dynamo Kyiv. He made two further appearances for Hoverla, before returning to Croatia.

Return to Hajduk
Šimić was promoted to the senior squad at Hajduk in January 2016. He made his debut for Hajduk on 1 March 2016, coming on as a late substitute in a match against Osijek. Šimić got his first 1. HNL start seven days later, playing the full match and keeping a clean sheet against Inter Zaprešić. By the end of the season, Šimić had made eleven appearances in all competitions for Hajduk.

Sampdoria
On 31 January 2017, Šimić moved to Serie A side Sampdoria.

Loan at SPAL
On 15 August 2018, Šimić moved on loan to SPAL for the second time with an option to buy.

Loan at Rijeka
On 8 August 2019, Šimić was loaned to Rijeka in Croatia for the 2019–20 season, with a buying option. On 13 November 2019 it was reported, that Šimić, alongside three other players, practically no longer was playing for the club, as he still had not made his debut. However, that was no reports claiming, that he had been recalled, but at the same time, it was reported that he had left Rijeka, however, not from an official source.

Loan at DAC Dunajská Streda
On 6 February 2020, Slovak club DAC Dunajská Streda announced Šimić joined them on loan until the end of the 2019–20 season. Overall he made 4 league appearances and three starts in the Slovnaft Cup. He did not score but recorded an assist in a league match against Zemplín Michalovce, by aiding a fellow Croat Marko Divković bring the lead to 2–0, in a match, that had concluded with a five-goal win.

Zagłębie Lubin
On 14 August 2020, he moved on a permanent basis to Polish club Zagłębie Lubin and signed a two-year contract. He left the club by mutual consent on 13 January 2022.

Lecce
On 16 January 2022, Lorenco joined Italian side Lecce until the end of the 2023–24 season, with an option to extend for additional year.

Ascoli
On 21 July 2022, Šimić moved to Ascoli on a two-year deal.

Career statistics

References

External links
 

1996 births
Living people
Footballers from Split, Croatia
Association football defenders
Croatian footballers
Croatia youth international footballers
Croatia under-21 international footballers
HNK Hajduk Split players
FC Hoverla Uzhhorod players
U.C. Sampdoria players
Empoli F.C. players
S.P.A.L. players
HNK Rijeka players
FC DAC 1904 Dunajská Streda players
Zagłębie Lubin players
U.S. Lecce players
Ascoli Calcio 1898 F.C. players
Croatian Football League players
Ukrainian Premier League players
Serie B players
Serie A players
Slovak Super Liga players
Ekstraklasa players
Croatian expatriate footballers
Expatriate footballers in Ukraine
Expatriate footballers in Italy
Expatriate footballers in Slovakia
Expatriate footballers in Poland
Croatian expatriate sportspeople in Ukraine
Croatian expatriate sportspeople in Italy
Croatian expatriate sportspeople in Slovakia
Croatian expatriate sportspeople in Poland